Enniskillen Rangers is a Northern Irish football club located in Enniskillen, County Fermanagh and play in the Fermanagh & Western League Division 1. The club are the current holders of the Irish Junior Cup and Fermanagh & Western Division One Champions.

Formed in 1953, Enniskillen Rangers play in the Fermanagh and Western Football League Division One. The club has won the prestigious Irish Junior Cup four times and finished runners-up four times. They have been Fermanagh & Western Division One champions eighteen times and Mulhern Cup winners sixteen times and are currently the most decorated team in County Fermanagh.

Between 1962-1966, the club won five Division One titles in a row. The 1999 season was the club's most successful, when they won the so-called 'Treble' - the Irish Junior Cup, the First Division and the Mulhern Cup. The club emphatically won the 2017 Irish Junior Cup  and in 2018, Enniskillen Rangers defended their title, winning back-to-back Irish Junior Cups for the first time in their history. In 2019, Enniskillen Rangers created history winning the prestigious Irish Junior Cup for a third time in a row.  They were defeated in the Final in 2020.

Ground
For the first fifteen years of their existence Rangers played at the old Broadmeadow ground, sharing with Enniskillen Corinthians.  This was followed by a ten year spell at the Commons, Bellanaleck, before they acquired a hundred year lease from Fermanagh District Council for the ground at McLaughlin’s Field, Derrychara. After Fermanagh District Council sold the Derrychara site to Tesco’s in 2004, and Rangers sold their lease, the club spent a number of years playing at the Lakeland Forum Playing Fields, while searching for a suitable site to develop their own facilities. 

After a difficult and protracted process, Rangers eventually acquired land at Woaghternerry on the outskirts of Enniskillen,and engaged Prunty Contacts Ltd to construct two sand-based pitches on the ten acre site. In the spring and summer of 2015, a clubhouse with changing rooms to Intermediate standard, fences enclosing the main pitch, turnstiles and car parking for 200 cars were constructed.  Rangers took up residence for the start of the 2015-16 season. The new grounds are located on the site of a shooting range used by Enniskillen Rifle Association in the late nineteenth century, and by the military, the police and the American Army in the first half of the twentieth century. Older locals still refer to the general area as “the Ball Range” so the club continued with the name when the grounds were put to a new sporting use. The ground has subsequently been improved by the addition of spectator stands and a VIP/Players' Lounge.

Irish Junior Cup

Enniskillen Rangers have played in eight Irish Junior Cup finals and have won the trophy four times. After vdefeats in the 1975 and 1989 Finals to Glebe Swifts and Oxford Utd respectively, their first win came in 1999 when they beat Lisburn Rangers at Loughgall FC.  The following year the club reached the Final again but were defeated by Lisnaskea Rovers at Ferney Park, Ballinamallard. The club reached the Final in 2017, the first to be held at the National Stadium at Windsor Park, beating  Hill Street. The club defeated Greenisland  in the 2018 Final, again at the National Stadium, retaining the trophy for the first time in the club's history. In 2018/19, the club won the Irish Junior Cup for a third time in a row, defeating Fermanagh and Western side Tummery Athletic at Ferney Park, Ballinamallard, and the following year were defeated in the Final on penalties by Willowbank at Shamrock Park, Portadown.

Winners

 1998-99 (4-0 v Lisburn Rangers) 
 2016-17 (5-1 v Hill Street) 
 2017-18 (2-0 v Greenisland)
 2018-19 (1-0 v Tummery Athletic)

Runners-up

 1974-75 (2-3 v Glebe Swifts) 
 1988-89 (0-1 v Oxford United
 1999-00 (3-4 v Lisnaskea Rovers)
 2019-20 (1-1 v Willowbank 5-3 AET, penalties)

Fermanagh & Western League Division One

Enniskillen Rangers have won the Fermanagh & Western Division One eighteen times (18) and finished in second place fourteen (14) times.

Champions
 1954/55
 1956/57
 1958/59
 1961/62
 1962/63
 1963/64
 1964/65
 1965/66
 1972/73
 1976/77
 1981/82
 1987/88
 1989/90
 1990/91
 1991/92
 1998/99
 2017/18
 2018/19

Runners-Up
 1955-56
 1957-58
 1967-68
 1968-69
 1971-72
 1973-74
 1974-75
 1982-83
 1983-84
 1984-85
 1988-89
 1993-94
 2001-02
 2019-20

Mulhern Cup

Enniskillen Rangers have won the Mulhern Cup sixteen times (16) and have beaten finalists six times.

Winners

 1956
 1957
 1958
 1959
 1962
 1964
 1965
 1978
 1981
 1982
 1984
 1988
 1993
 1995
 1999
 2022

Finalists

 1977
 1986
 1989
 1992
 1994
 1998

Lowry-Corry Cup

Winners
 2014/14

Kennedy Cup

Winners
 2017
 2018

Notable players
 Sandy Fulton
 Jim Cleary
 Joe Keenan 
 Nigel Birney
 Adrian Hopkins
 Dessie Donegan

External Sources
 Fermanagh & Western Football League
 Northern Ireland Junior Football

References

Association football clubs in Northern Ireland
Association football clubs in County Fermanagh